Punjab Institute of Management and Technology (PIMT) is a technical college established in 1997 by Gobindgarh Educational and Social Welfare Trust.

Courses 
PIMT runs full-time AICTE approved postgraduate programmes in MBA, MCA & UG, in addition to programmes in BBA, BCA, B.Com. (Professional), BMS (ATH) and Bsc (Agriculture). The institute is offering specializations in Marketing, HR, Finance, Operations and IT for MBA course.

External links
Official Website

Universities and colleges in Punjab, India
Ludhiana district
Educational institutions established in 1997
1997 establishments in Punjab, India